Charles Ernest Strick (September 15, 1858 – November 18, 1933) was an American catcher in Major League Baseball. He played for the 1882 Louisville Eclipse.

External links

1858 births
1933 deaths
19th-century baseball players
Major League Baseball catchers
Louisville Eclipse players
Baseball players from Pennsylvania
Sportspeople from Erie, Pennsylvania
American people of Dutch descent